Mount Archer National Park is a national park in Central Queensland, Australia,  northwest of Brisbane. It makes up the backdrop to the city of Rockhampton which marks the start of Tropical Queensland.

The  Darumbal tribe Raki-warra clan considers the park as a part of its traditional country. It was explored by the Archer brothers in 1853 and was later named after them. In 1898, the site of the park was set aside as a water reserve and a timber reserve in 1940. The grazing went on until 1985 and later the area came under the supervision of the Queensland Parks and Wildlife Service. It became an environmental park in 1987 and was declared a national park in 1994. 

The vegetation is mostly open eucalypt woodland with patches of vine scrub. The rufous shrikethrush, white-browed scrubwren, powerful owl and glossy black cockatoo are some of the bird species found in the park.

A road leads to the summit of Mount Archer, where there are a few bushwalking and rock climbing opportunities.

See also

 Protected areas of Queensland

References

External links

Mount Archer National Park - Queensland Holidays

National parks of Central Queensland
Rockhampton
Protected areas established in 1994
1994 establishments in Australia